The 2000 Iowa State Cyclones football team represented the Iowa State University in the 2000 NCAA Division I-A football season. This was Dan McCarney's sixth season as head coach. The team captains were Chris Anthony, Ryan Harklau, Reggie Hayward, and Sage Rosenfels. The Cyclones were quarterbacked by Sage Rosenfels. Sage is among many former Cyclones from the 2000 team to make it to the NFL. Others were J. J. Moses, Reggie Hayward, Ennis Haywood, Tony Yelk, Mike Banks, Jordan Carstens, Tyson Smith and James Reed. It was Iowa State's first appearance in a bowl game since the 1978 Peach Bowl. The Insight.com Bowl victory was the programs first victory ever in bowl game. Iowa State was picked by the media to finish 5th in the Big 12 North Division. Two players participated in post season bowl games. Sage Rosenfels played in the Senior Bowl and Reggie Hayward played in the Hula Bowl where he won the defensive MVP. Iowa State's nine victories were the most since 1906.

Schedule
The Ohio game's date and time was changed from August 31 at 7 p.m. to September 2 at 11:30 a.m. The Baylor game was originally scheduled for 1:00 p.m., but was changed to 6:00 p.m. The Nebraska game was originally scheduled for kickoff at 1:00 p.m., it was changed to 2:30 p.m. to accommodate a broadcast on ABC. The Oklahoma State game was originally scheduled for 1:00 p.m. but was changed to 7:00 p.m.
The Missouri game time was changed from 1:00 p.m. to 6:00 p.m. to accommodate a Fox Sports Net cablecast. On December 3 Iowa State announced it would accept a bowl invitation from the Insight.com Bowl.

Game summaries

Game 1: vs. Ohio Bobcats

Game 2: vs. UNLV Rebels

Game 3: @ Iowa Hawkeyes

Game 4: @ Baylor Bears

Game 5: vs. Nebraska Cornhuskers

Game 6: @ Oklahoma State Cowboys

Game 7: vs. Texas A&M Aggies

Game 8: vs. Missouri Tigers

Game 9: @ Kansas State Wildcats

Game 10: @ Colorado Buffaloes

Game 11: vs. Kansas Jayhawks

Game 12: vs. Pittsburgh Panthers

Personnel

Roster
On June 30, 2000 FB Robert Lewis was dismissed from the team for violating team rules.

List of signees.

Depth chart

Note: No= Number; Name = Name; Pos = Position; Ht = Height; Wt = Weight; Yr = Year; Hometown = Hometown; * = Letter earned;
C = Captain

Coaching staff

Player statistics

Passing
Note: Att= Attempts; Cmp= Completions; PCT= Percent; Yds = Yards; Tds = Touchdowns; Int = Interceptions

Rushing
Note: Att= Attempts; Yds = Yards; AVG = Average; Tds = Touchdowns

Receiving
Note: Rec= Receptions; Yds = Yards; AVG = Average; Tds = Touchdowns

Scoring
Note: TDs = Touchdowns; Rush = Rushing; Rec = Receiving; Ret = Return; PTS = Points

Kicking
Note: Pat = Point after touchdown; FG = Field goal; PTS = Points

Rankings

AP Poll
Iowa State did not receive any points in the previous AP polls until October 1, 2000.
On October 1, 2000 Iowa State received 5 points ranking them T-36th overall.
On October 8, 2000 Iowa State received 8 points ranking them 34th overall.
On October 15, 2000 Iowa State received 19 points ranking them 29th overall.
On October 22, 2000 Iowa State received 3 points ranking them 37th overall.
On October 29, 2000 Iowa State received 2 points ranking them T-36th overall.
On November 5, 2000 Iowa State did not receive any points.
On November 12, 2000 Iowa State received 6 points ranking them 33rd overall.
On November 19, 2000 Iowa State received 10 points ranking them 31st overall.
On November 26, 2000 Iowa State received 25 points ranking them 30th overall.
On December 3, 2000 Iowa State received 22 points ranking them 30th overall.
In the final poll Iowa State was ranked 25th with 188 points.

Coaches Poll
Iowa State did not receive any points in the coaches poll until September 17, 2000. On September 17, 2000 Iowa State received 4 points ranking them T-43rd. On September 24, 2000 Iowa State received 7 points for a ranking of 39th. On October 1, 2000 Iowa State received 37 points for a ranking of 31st. On October 8, 2000 Iowa State received 22 points for a ranking of T-35th. On October 15, 2000 Iowa State received 35 points for a ranking of 29th. On October 22, 2000 Iowa State received 2 points for a ranking of T-39th. On October 29, 2000 Iowa State received 16 points for a ranking of 33rd. On November 5, 2000 Iowa State did not receive any points in the poll. On November 12, 2000 Iowa State received 14 points for a ranking of 34th. On November 19, 2000 Iowa State received 14 points for a ranking of T-31st. On November 26, 2000 Iowa State received 28 points for a ranking of 30th. On December 3, 2000 Iowa State received 29 points for a ranking of 30th.  On January 4, 2001 in the final poll of the year Iowa State received 225 points for a ranking of 23rd.

BCS Poll
Iowa State was never ranked in the BCS poll.

Week-by-week

Awards

NFL players
 Reggie Hayward, 2001 third-round draft pick of the Denver Broncos
 Sage Rosenfels, 2001 fourth-round draft pick of the Washington Redskins
 James Reed, 2001 Seventh-round draft pick of the New York Jets
 Mike Banks, 2002 Seventh-round draft pick of the Arizona Cardinals
 J.J. Moses, Green Bay Packers
 Ennis Haywood, Dallas Cowboys
 Tony Yelk, Atlanta Falcons
 Jordan Carstens, Carolina Panthers
 Tyson Smith, New York Giants

References

Additional sources
 

Iowa State
Iowa State Cyclones football seasons
Guaranteed Rate Bowl champion seasons
Iowa State Cyclones football